Vladislav Leonidovich Malkevich (Малькевич, Владислав Леонидович; Yasynuvata, 30 June 1936) is a Russian economist.

He was General Director of Expocentre ZAO (from November 2002 to Marth 2012), member of the Board of Directors of UFI – the Global Association of Exhibition Industry (2003), Vice President of RUEF – the Russian Union of Exhibitions and Fairs (2003), member of the International Academy of Business (2001), member of  the International Academy of Creative Endeavors (1999).

Education and academic degrees 
University Degree of the Moscow Power Engineering Institute (1959), the All-Union Academy of Foreign Trade  (1978)
Doctor of Technical Sciences (1968)
Doctor of Economics (1982).

Biography 
Vladislav Leonidovich Malkevich was born on 30 June 1936 in Yasinovataya, Donetsk Region, the Ukrainian SSR. The Great Patriotic War was on as he was going through his childhood. His father Leonid Petrovich Malkevich served as Chief of the South Urals Railroads. Vladislav's mother was a teacher of the Russian language and literature.

Years in Radio Engineering
Vladislav graduated from Moscow Power Engineering Institute in 1959 majoring in radio technology. Under the system of job distribution current at the time, he was sent to work at a defence plant under the Ministry for Radio Industry of the USSR. His positions were: Equipment Tune-Up Engineer and later Foreman. Soon after Malkevich was promoted to the position of head of the section in charge of onboard equipment for strategic rockets. Those were installed at strategic launching pads manned by special units of the Soviet Army throughout the Country. Later he was put in charge of two assembly shops at the Plant. That was the time he was awarded his first medal from the Government: “For Work Excellence”.

In 1963 V.L. Malkevich was appointed Deputy Chief Engineer of the same plant, thus covering the distance from a rank and file engineer up to the high position of a Deputy Chief Engineer of a major defence plant in only 4 years. From 1966 to 1971 V.L. Malkevich was Chief Engineer, Deputy Director for Research of the Central Research Institute for Technology of the Ministry for Radio Industry of the USSR.

Move to Ministry for Foreign Trade

In 1971 V.L. Malkevich was offered the position of the Head of a major trade policy division of the Ministry for Foreign Trade in charge of new technology/innovation-related issues (GITU). While at the Ministry, Vladislav Malkevich had a very close working relationship with then Minister for Foreign Trade Nikolay Semenovich Patolichev. As the First Deputy Minister for Foreign Trade and later President of the Chamber of Commerce and Industry of the USSR V.L. Malkevich Chaired the Soviet Side of the American-Soviet and Japanese-Soviet Trade/Economic Councils.

In 1988 V.L. Malkevich became President of the Chamber of Commerce and Industry of the USSR, the position he held until 1992. As a major national public entity, the CCI had great powers in setting up direct links with foreign companies, helped “defrost” relations with Israel, SAR, South Korea and pioneering in a relationship that preceded formal diplomatic ties with those countries when proper embassies are set up. Under V.L. Malkevich's leadership, the CCI of the USSR was vigorously developing local chambers of commerce and industry in autonomous republics and regions of Russia.

Currency and Exports Control
From 1992 to 1998 V.L. Malkevich worked at commercial entities in Russia.

There came a time when V.L. Malkevich's record of a successful government executive was in great demand again to help in the National effort to uplift the country's economy. In 1998 he was offered to head the Russian Federal Service for Currencies and Exports Control (VEK). His Organization managed to help curb the outflow of capital from the Country working in close contact with the Central Bank of the Russian Federation and cold start the economy on a revival cycle. In 1999 a new law on export control was passed by the parliament drafted with the direct participation of V.L. Malkevich. The law is still current to-day mildly adjusted from its original form.

Expocentre ZAO
In 2002 Vladislav Malkevich was appointed Chief Executive  (General Director) of Expocentre ZAO starting a new cycle of success in the Company's history scoring more than twofold growth in its gross revenue figures and over 1.8 fold increase in productivity as a result of considerable expansion of Expocentre's exhibitions and conventions programs. Expocentre is the only exhibition entity to-date that has been awarded a special prize of the Government of the Russian Federation for Quality (2009).

Under V.L. Malkevich's leadership Expocentre achieved impressive results which were noted by many reputable awards: Golden Mercury national prize (2005, 2011); international prize: Leader of Economic Development of Russia (2006) and: For Contribution in the Doubling of GNP-2007. International prizes: European Quality (2008) award and “Socrates Prize” in the nomination Economy and Business (2008) were awarded in Oxford, UK.

Expocentre is engaged in charity projects, promotes ideas of preservation and restoration of Russian spiritual life and cultural traditions. A church dedicated to Reverend Serafim Sarovsky has been built on Expocentre Fairgrounds (the first church in Russia built on the premises of an exhibition venue). Expocentre helps the development of the Ladia project, which is a unique show of Russian crafts. Expocentre is the general sponsor  of the Kostroma National Dancing Company.

In 2011 Vladislav Leonidovich Malkevich handed over his collection of art made of over 200 pieces of painting and graphics as a gift to Expocentre.

Personal life
V.L. Malkevich has two daughters, a granddaughter, and a grandson.

Decorations and awards 

V.L. Malkevich has many State, Public and Church awards and decorations. Among them:

State Decorations:

For Services to the Nation, IV Degree
Order of Lenin
Order of the Red Banner of Labour
Order of Friendship of Peoples
Medal "For Labour Valour"

Public Awards:

Order: The Pride of the Nation
Order: The Glory of the Nation, 1st Degree(a Gold Star with a Ruby) 
Gold Order: Hero of Labor, 1st Degree
Gold Order: Hero of Labor with Diamond
Honorary Order: Best Manager of Russia
Gold Medal: For Contribution to the Development of the CIS

Awards of the Russian Orthodox Church:

Order of the Great Saint Duke Vladimir, aequalis apostolis
Order of Reverend Serafim Sarovsky
Order of the Orthodox Church of Kazakhstan “Algys” (Gratitude)

Works 
Over 150 works and publications in the area of foreign economic relations. Examples include:

V.L. Malkevich, Technological Exchanges. East-West. – M. Nauka – 128 pp.
V.L. Malkevich, I.L. Mitrofanov, A.S. Ivanov, “Foreign Trade of the USSR with N.S. Patolichev (1958-1985). M.: Literary Heritage.- 415 pp.
V.L. Malkevich, “Export Control: from counteraction to interaction”. – M.: Literary Heritage.- 487 pp.

References

External links
 Expocentre

1936 births
Living people
Recipients of the Order of Lenin
Russian economists